Tessa Wyatt (born 23 April 1948) is an English actress best known for her role as Vicky Tripp (née Nicholls) on the ITV sitcom Robin's Nest.

Early life
Wyatt was born in Woking, Surrey in 1948 and attended Elmhurst Ballet School. She was encouraged to act by her maternal grandmother and got her first professional job at the age of 12, appearing in a television programme featuring Richard Hearne's Mr. Pastry character. Soon after, she was represented by an agent.

Career
Wyatt's early television appearances include parts in Z-Cars, The Wednesday Play, Public Eye, Callan, Dixon of Dock Green, Doctor at Large, Play for Today, UFO and The Goodies. Her film appearances include Wedding Night (1970), the cult horror film The Beast in the Cellar (1970), England Made Me (1973) opposite Peter Finch and Spy Story (1976).

From 1977 to 1981, played Vicky Nicholls, later Tripp, in the ITV sitcom Robin's Nest. Her on-screen boyfriend Robin Tripp was played by Richard O'Sullivan. Following Robin's Nest, Wyatt appeared in Return of the Saint, Boon and 2point4 Children.

Wyatt was part of the original cast of the Channel Five soap opera Family Affairs, playing Samantha Cockerill. Since 2000 she has also appeared in Casualty and Doctors. She appeared in the fifth series of Peep Show as Jeremy's mother and was Tom's love interest in an episode of The Old Guys opposite Roger Lloyd-Pack and Clive Swift. In 2013, she joined the cast of EastEnders, playing Betty Spragg. She made a second appearance on the BBC series Doctors on 19 May 2015 alongside George Layton, another sitcom stalwart from the 1970s.

Personal life
In 1972, Wyatt married radio DJ Tony Blackburn, with whom she had a son, Simon, born in 1973. The couple divorced in 1977. For seven years from 1978, Wyatt was in a relationship with her Robin's Nest co-star Richard O'Sullivan, with whom she also had a son, Jamie. She married property developer Bill Harkness at the Hammersmith register office in 1986, and they have two children.

References

External links

1948 births
Living people
English television actresses
People educated at the Elmhurst School for Dance